Dariusz Batek (born 27 April 1986 in Oświęcim) is a Polish former professional cyclist.

Major results

2007
 2nd Time trial, National Under-23 Road Championships
2008
 4th Time trial, National Under-23 Road Championships
2009
 7th Overall Tour of Małopolska
2010
 2nd Szlakiem Walk Majora Hubala
 6th Overall Tour of Małopolska
 9th Time trial, National Road Championships
2015
 4th Overall Szlakiem Grodów Piastowskich
 4th Visegrad 4 Bicycle Race – GP Czech Republic
 4th Race Horizon Park Maidan
 6th Overall Tour of Małopolska
 6th Visegrad 4 Bicycle Race – GP Polski
 7th Overall Course de Solidarność et des Champions Olympiques
 8th Race Horizon Park Classic
2016
 2nd Visegrad 4 Bicycle Race – GP Kerékpárverseny
 3rd Visegrad 4 Bicycle Race – GP Polski
 4th Overall Szlakiem Grodów Piastowskich
1st  Points classification
 4th Visegrad 4 Bicycle Race – GP Slovakia
 4th Race Horizon Park Race for Peace
 8th Overall Tour of Małopolska
1st Stage 1

References

External links

1986 births
Living people
Polish male cyclists
People from Oświęcim
Sportspeople from Lesser Poland Voivodeship